Qingshanqiao may refer to:

Qingshanqiao, Ningxiang, a town in Ningxiang County, Hunan, China
Qingshanqiao, Xiangtan, a town in Xiangtan County, Hunan, China